Maria Antonietta Macciocchi (23 July 1922 – 15 April 2007) was an Italian journalist, writer, feminist and politician, elected to the Italian Parliament in 1968 as an Italian Communist Party candidate and to the European Parliament in 1979 as a candidate of the Radical Party.

Life
Macciocchi was born in Isola del Liri, the child of anti-fascists. She joined the underground Italian Communist Party (PCI) during the German occupation of Rome. In 1950 she became editor of the party's women's magazine Vie Nuove. Then she edited a feminist magazine financed by the PCI, Noi donne. She joined l'Unità, the paper founded by Antonio Gramsci, becoming their foreign correspondent in Algiers and Paris. In the 1960s she lectured at Vincennes University France, and her book Pour Gramsci was credited with introducing Gramsci's thought to French intellectuals.

Returning to Italy in 1968 to stand in the general election as a candidate for Naples, she kept up a correspondence with Louis Althusser about both working-class conditions and local party management. Though elected, her publication of the correspondence helped to ensure that the PCI did not put her forward for re-election in 1972. She travelled to China for l'Unità, praising the Cultural Revolution in the resultant book, Dalla Cina: dopo la rivoluzione culturale. In 1977 she was expelled from the PCI for supporting Maoists in Bologna.

In 1979 she was elected Member of the European Parliament (MEP) for the Radical Party.

Correspondent from the world
Macciocchi alternated work as an MEP to that of a journalist, writing for major newspapers such as Corriere della Sera, Le Monde and El Pais articles from the most diverse parts of the world, from Cambodia to Iran and Jerusalem. In 1992, the French President François Mitterrand awarded her the Legion of Honor. In the same year, she met Pope John Paul II and was fascinated by his charismatic personality. She wrote about the Pope in "Le donne secondo Wojtyla" (Women according to Wojtyla), an unexpected book that aroused more controversy for her "conversion" from admirer of Mao Zedong to admirer of the Pope.

Later activities
In the 1990s Macciocchi lessened her journalistic activities in order to concentrate on book writing. She published works devoted to the history of Naples at the end of the 1700s and the events of the Neapolitan Republic. In 1993 she published 'Cara Eleonora' dedicated to Eleonora Fonseca Pimentel, and in 1998 came 'L'amante della rivoluzione', on the figure of Luisa Sanfelice.

In the European elections of 1994 Macciocchi was a candidate for parliament in the lists of the Patto Segni, but was not elected.

Works
Persia in lotta [Iran in struggle], edizioni di Cultura Sociale 1952
Lettere dall'interno del P.C.I. a Louis Althusser, Feltrinelli 1969. Translated by Stephen M. Hellman as Letters from inside the Italian Communist Party to Louis Althusser, 1973.
Dalla Cina : dopo la rivoluzione culturale, Feltrinelli 1971. Translated by Alfred Ehrenfeld and Frank Kehl as Daily Life in Revolutionary China, 1972
Polemiche sulla Cina, Feltrinelli 1972
Per Gramsci, Il Mulino 1974
La donna "nera": Consenso femminile e fascismo, Feltrinelli 1976
Éléments pour une analyse du fascisme: séminaire de Maria-A. Macciocchi, Paris III-Vincennes, 1974–1975, 1976
La sexualité féminine dans l'idéologie fasciste, Tel Quel No. 66 (1976), pp. 26–42
La talpa francese, Feltrinelli 1977
De la France, 1977
Après Marx, Book of the Espresso avril, 1978
Pasolini, Grasset Paris 1980
Duemila anni di felicità, Mondadori 1983
Di là dalle porte di bronzo, mondadori 1987
La donna con la valigia, Oscar Mondadori 1989
La forza degli italiani, Mondadori 1990
Le donne secondo Wojtyla, Edizioni Paoline 1992
Cara Eleonora: Passione e morte della Fonseca Pimentel nella Rivoluzione napoletana, Rizzoli 1993
L'amante della rivoluzione. La vera storia di Luisa sanfelica e della Repubblica napoletana del 1799, mondadori 1997

Bibliography 
 Eleonora Selvi, "Marie Antoinette Macciocchi.'s Intellectual heretic", Arachne, Rome 2012.

References

External links
Personal Card to the European Parliament
The Story of Mary Macciocchi (Told by Marie A. Macciocchi, 5 September 1996 to Historical Institute for Social History in Amsterdam)

1922 births
2007 deaths
People from Isola del Liri
Italian Communist Party politicians
Radical Party (Italy) politicians
Deputies of Legislature V of Italy
Deputies of Legislature VIII of Italy
Radical Party (Italy) MEPs
Party of European Socialists MEPs
MEPs for Italy 1979–1984
Politicians of Lazio
Italian women journalists
20th-century Italian women writers
Italian writers
Italian feminists
Communist women writers
Italian magazine editors
Italian women editors
Sapienza University of Rome alumni
Women magazine editors
Italian socialist feminists